Margriet Eshuijs (14 October 1952 – 29 December 2022) was a Dutch singer.

Life and career 
Eshuijs was born in Zaandam, where her parents ran a music school and a record shop. A multi-instrumentist who played guitar, piano, organ and keyboards, Eshuijs started her professional career in 1972 co-founding the group , best known for the songs "" and "Scarlet Lady" . After the group disbanded, Eshuijs continued her career as a solo artist, while also serving at the Music Conservatory in Alkmaar. Her major solo hit was the song "Black Pearl". In her later years she established a Margriet Eshuijs Pop Choir and was part of a local band, The Dream, led from her partner Maarten Peters.  

During her career Eshuijs received numerous accolades and honours, notably three Edison Awards, a Golden Harp and the title of Knight of the Order of Orange-Nassau. She died on 29 December 2022, at the age of 70.

Discography 
with Lucifer

As We Are, 1975
Margriet, 1977

 Solo albums
 On the Move Again, 1979
 Right on Time, 1981
 Eye to Eye, 1982
 Sometimes, 1991
 The Wee Small Hours, 1993
 Shadow Dancing, 1996
 Step into the Light, 1998
 Time, 2001
 In Concert, 2005

References

External links

 

1952 births
2022 deaths
Dutch pop singers
Dutch women singers
Knights of the Order of Orange-Nassau
People from Zaanstad